Nesebar Gap (Sedlovina Nesebar \se-dlo-vi-'na ne-'se-b&r\) is a 1.3 km wide gap in eastern Livingston Island in the South Shetland Islands, Antarctica bounded to the west by Pliska Ridge and to the east by the northern slope of Mount Friesland, Tangra Mountains.  It is part of the divide between the glacial catchments of Perunika Glacier to the north and Huntress Glacier to the south.  The gap is part of an overland route between Orpheus Gate to the west, and Camp Academia locality and Lozen Saddle to the east.

The Nesebar Gap was first mapped in detail by the Spanish Servicio Geográfico del Ejército in 1991.  Nesebar is the name of a town on the Bulgarian Black Sea Coast.

Location

Maps
 L.L. Ivanov et al. Antarctica: Livingston Island and Greenwich Island, South Shetland Islands. Scale 1:100000 topographic map. Sofia: Antarctic Place-names Commission of Bulgaria, 2005.
 L.L. Ivanov. Antarctica: Livingston Island and Greenwich, Robert, Snow and Smith Islands. Scale 1:120000 topographic map.  Troyan: Manfred Wörner Foundation, 2009.  
 Antarctic Digital Database (ADD). Scale 1:250000 topographic map of Antarctica. Scientific Committee on Antarctic Research (SCAR). Since 1993, regularly upgraded and updated.
 L.L. Ivanov. Antarctica: Livingston Island and Smith Island. Scale 1:100000 topographic map. Manfred Wörner Foundation, 2017.

References
 Nesebar Gap. SCAR Composite Antarctic Gazetteer
 Bulgarian Antarctic Gazetteer. Antarctic Place-names Commission. (details in Bulgarian, basic data in English)

External links
 Nesebar Gap. Copernix satellite image

Tangra Mountains